Naburn railway station was a railway station which served the village of Naburn, south of York, on the East Coast Main Line. It closed to passengers in 1953 and to goods services in 1964; the station building was a hostel for a short period of time before being purchased as a private residence and is in the process of being refurbished. In 1983 the Selby Diversion was opened which led to the closure of the railway line through Naburn; the trackbed is now used as a cycle path between York and Selby and is part of the National Cycle Network and the Trans Pennine Trail.

References

Railway stations in Great Britain opened in 1871
Railway stations in Great Britain closed in 1953
Disused railway stations in North Yorkshire
Former North Eastern Railway (UK) stations